The coat of arms of Budapest (capital city of Hungary) has existed since 1873, when the three main cities next the Danube river (Buda, Pest and Óbuda) were united in one after existing during a millennium separately. The city committee that was planning the city's unification asked the master-painter Lajos Friedrich that design the coat of arms based in the cities' previous symbols and coats.

Description of the coat of arms
The coat of arms is composed by two blasons: the superior contains a castle with one tower that represents Pest, as well the inferior a three-towered castle that actually symbolizes Buda (where the Royal Palace of Buda is located). The undulated white stripe in the middle of both blasons represents the Danube river which separates Buda and Pest (passing through the middle of the city). On the top of the coat of arms lies the Crown of the King Saint Stephen, and a two legs standing lion grabs with its protector claws the city symbol on the left side, as a mythological griffin stands on the right side.

History
After Hungary was invaded by the Soviet armies, soon the coat of arms lost the Holy Crown on it, and was used from 1946 to 1949 without it. Between 1964 and 1990, a new coat of arms was used, avoiding to use the traditional Hungarian symbols that did not match with the communist ideals. After the fall of the Soviet Union, Hungary recovered its independence and in 1990 the original coat of arms created in 1873 was again reestablished.

Gallery

References

Bibliography
 
 

1873 establishments in Hungary
Culture in Budapest
History of Budapest
Budapest
Budapest
Budapest
Budapest